Cheshmeh Rashid (also Romanized as Cheshmeh Rashīd) is a village in Karezan Rural District, Karezan District, Sirvan County, Ilam Province, Iran. According to the 2006 census, its population was 274, in 58 families. The village is populated by Kurds.

References 

Populated places in Sirvan County
Kurdish settlements in Ilam Province